Antoine Petit (23 July 1722 – 21 October 1794) was a French physician, master of Joseph-Ignace Guillotin and Félix Vicq d'Azyr.

Biography
Antoine Petit, born in Orléans, was the son of a tailor.
He received a disciplined education and, after studying at the Orléans college, he took up the study of medicine at the University of Paris where he received his doctorate in 1746.

Soon he became a good teacher and lecturer in anatomy, surgery and childbirth.

The accurateness of his diagnosis made him famous and he got a very busy practise, drawing people from every part of France, even of Europa.

He was appointed anatomy professor at Jardin du Roi from 1769 to 1778. In the University of Paris, he founded a chair of anatomy then a chair of surgery. The professors, engaged and appointed by the University, had to teach for ten years then made way for younger. He was a member of French Academy of Sciences and wrote several articles for the Diderot and d'Alembert Encyclopédie.

Antoine Petit amassed a significant wealth then, because he had no child, spent a part to found places that accord medical treatment. He spent more than 100,000 French livres to Orléans city: he appointed four physicians and two surgeons for free health care for sick people and those in every kind of need, in a house he built in this purpose. On market days, they took care of those from the country.

In the same way, he appointed two lawyers and a prosecutor who involved towards the poor.

In Fontenay-aux-Roses, he donated a building to house the municipality medical officer.

He died in Olivet, on 1794.

Bibliography
  Paris. 2 vol. in-12
 Antoine Petit (1757). Discours sur l'utilité de la chirurgie. Paris. in-4°
 Antoine Petit (1765). Projet de réforme sur l'exercice de la médecine en France. Paris. in-4°
 Antoine Petit (1765). Consultation en faveur de la légitimité des naissances tardives. Paris. in-8°
  2 vol. in-8°
  Paris. in-8°
  Paris. in-8°
  Paris. 2 vol. in-8°

Notes
 A street bears his name in Fontenay-aux-Roses.

References

External links
 

1722 births
1794 deaths
18th-century French physicians
Members of the French Academy of Sciences
Physicians from Orléans
Contributors to the Encyclopédie (1751–1772)
French male writers